The discography of West Coast hip hop artist Mack 10 consists of eight studio albums, two compilation albums, twenty-two singles, and fifteen music videos. He has also collaborated on two albums and was featured in two soundtrack albums. After signing to Priority Records in 1995, Mack 10 released his self-titled debut album in June. The album, produced by fellow rapper Ice Cube, saw considerable commercial success and went Gold in the US. His prosperity continued when he released Based on a True Story, which peaked at number fourteen on the US Billboard 200. The rapper collaborated with Tha Dogg Pound to record "Nothin' But the Cavi Hit" which was released on the Rhyme & Reason soundtrack. Mack 10's 1998 release, The Recipe, was the rapper's third and final album to be certified Gold in the US by RIAA. Mack 10's album sales began to decline after his first compilation album release, Hoo-Bangin': The Mix Tape, Vol. 1. His fourth studio album, The Paper Route (2000), debuted at number nineteen on the Billboard 200; however, it failed to earn the rapper any RIAA certifications.

Mack 10 left Priority Records after The Paper Route, and his next album, Bang or Ball (2001), was released through Cash Money and Universal Records. His album sales continued to decelerate with his 2003 album, Ghetto, Gutter & Gangsta, which was released through Bungalo Records. In 2005, he released Hustla's Handbook under Capitol Records. The album did significantly better than his previous, peaking at number sixty-five on the Billboard 200—forty places above Ghetto, Gutter & Gangsta. His most recent solo album, Soft White (2009), was released through Fontana Distribution and at number 141, it is his lowest charting album on the Billboard 200.

Albums

Studio albums

Compilations

Soundtracks

Collaborations

Singles

Guest appearances

Music videos

See also
Westside Connection discography

References

External links
Mack 10 discography at AllMusic

Mack 10 discography at MTV

Discographies of American artists
Hip hop discographies